The 1998 Clemson Tigers football team represented Clemson University during the 1998 NCAA Division I-A football season.  Head coach Tommy West was fired shortly after the conclusion of the season.

Schedule

References

Clemson
Clemson Tigers football seasons
Clemson Tigers football